Langeskavlen is a mountain in Vang Municipality in Innlandet county, Norway. The mountain is surrounded by several other notable mountains including Falketinden to the west, Uranostinden and Langeskavltinden to the northwest, Storegut and Høgbrothøgdi to the northeast, and Galdeberget and Slettmarkpiggen to the east.

See also
List of mountains of Norway by height

References

Vang, Innlandet
Mountains of Innlandet